The Southern Bridge is an extradosed bridge built across the Daugava River in Riga, the capital of Latvia. The bridge was constructed between 2004 and 2008, and was opened on November 17, 2008. Construction of the access roads lasted until 2013.

Because of the bridge's huge cost it also become colloquially known as The Golden Bridge (Zelta tilts).

Construction costs 

The government control commission in a report for January 2002 to September 2008 showed that, during that period, costs increased fivefold – from a planned 108.84 million lats (154.87 million €) to 570.14 million lats (811.24 million €). In 2011 Riga City Council terminated the agreement with Southern Bridge third round builders due to lack of funds. In early 2012 Riga City Council signed agreement with the new constructors to carry out final works of third stage of the Southern bridge and borrowed an additional seven million euros for funding.

In 2009 The Economy Police launched a criminal case on suspected violations in construction of the bridge. State Audit Office concluded that the Riga City Council had squandered 27 million lats in the construction. In 2013 the students of Stockholm School of Economics in Riga calculated that the same bridge could've been built for a budget two times smaller.

References 

Extradosed bridges
Extradosed bridges in Latvia
Bridges in Riga
Crossings of the Daugava River
Cable-stayed bridges in Latvia